Arve Vorvik (born 7 January 1974) is a retired Norwegian ski jumper.

In the World Cup he finished once among the top 10, with an eighth place from Iron Mountain in February 1996.

He participated in the 1995 World Championships in Thunder Bay, where he finished 28th in the large hill.

He resides in Trondheim.

References
 

1974 births
Living people
Norwegian male ski jumpers
Sportspeople from Trondheim
20th-century Norwegian people